Kickboxer 4 (stylized on-screen as Kickboxer 4: The Aggressor) is a 1994 American direct-to-video martial arts film directed by Albert Pyun. The film is the fourth entry in the Kickboxer film series. This was the last film to star Sasha Mitchell, who reprises his role as David Sloan.

Plot 
The film opens with a recap of earlier events in the series as David Sloan writes a letter to his wife, Vicky. After being framed for murder by Tong Po, David has spent the last two years in prison, while his wife has become the sexual captive of his old nemesis, who has since become one of the most powerful drug lords in Mexico.

After receiving explicit photos from Po of his kidnapped wife, David takes his frustrations out on a fellow prisoner before meeting with a DEA official, Casey Ford, who briefs David about their situation. He reveals that the agency has been unable to apprehend Po by their own means, and that Po intends to host a martial arts tournament at his private compound, with the winner earning a match against Po and a $1,000,000 cash prize. Knowing the history between them, Casey offers to release David if he will enter the tournament and eliminate Po himself. David readily accepts, using the alias "Jack Jones" to conceal his identity. His first stop is a street fight, where he easily dispatches two fighters earning him a necessary invitation from a man named Brubaker, who scouts fighters and invites them to Po's tournament.

On his way to the border, David enters a roadside bar and confronts a group of thugs harassing a young woman named Megan Laurence. David defeats them with ease and saves the woman, who is ungrateful for his help and reveals that she is entering the tournament as well. David arrives at the compound and is greeted by Darcy Cove, one of Po's many female sex slaves, who tells him that he must compete in the qualifying matches. David witnesses Thomas, a brutal fighter, take out another young fighter. Then, David is chosen to face Megan. Reluctant to harm the young woman despite her taunting, David passively subdues her. He also meets up with an old acquaintance named Lando Smith, a talented fighter who turns out to be his backup on the mission.

At the party of the tournament's seventh anniversary, Bill, Po's right-hand man, introduces Po to the crowd. David leaves the party soon after to search for his wife but finds the entire compound to be heavily guarded. Meanwhile, Po offers Megan a second chance to compete, but places a bounty on her head inciting all the other fighters to attack her at once. Megan holds her own until Po attacks her, prompting Lando to intervene. After a brief standoff with Po, Lando escorts Megan back to her room.

That night, David searches the compound and manages to locate his wife but is unable to free her before the alarm sounds. On Po's orders, the guards try to apprehend him, but David escapes. The next morning, he befriends Megan and offers his help for the upcoming tournament.

The tournament begins with several matches taking place. David witnesses Thomas incapacitate a female judoka fighter, while Lando and Megan both win their respective matches. When David is called up to fight, Lando approaches Darcy to divert Po's attention away from him. David wins his fight quickly and escapes Po's notice.

In an effort to gain more intelligence about David's wife, Lando enters a romance with Darcy and presses her for information while offering to help her escape from Po. Darcy provides him with the necessary intel which he passes on to David before being caught by Bill and his guards. Po tortures Lando to learn why he has come to the tournament, but unable to get a satisfactory answer, he brings forth Darcy and tortures her in front of Lando, forcing him to admit that he is a DEA agent. Lando pleads for Darcy's life, but Po tortures her to death.

Meanwhile, David seeks to free his wife but is unable to find her since Po had her moved from her original cell as a result of his previous intrusion. David is then captured by Po, who is surprised to see his old rival. On the final day of the tournament, Po declares that all fights will be to the death and dismisses several fighters who are unwilling to risk their lives, but shoots them all dead as they depart. The tournament proceeds with even more fighters killed at the hands of their opponents, until both Lando and David are dragged into the arena.

Po announces that the tournament is a memorial to his late wife, Sian, who was killed five years prior when the DEA invaded his home. He blames David for her death and offers a $500,000 bonus to whoever is able to defeat David. Thomas accepts the challenge, but David is able to defeat him. Po calls for more challengers, and the other two remaining fighters step forward. One after the other, David proves to be more than a match for them. In frustration, Po orders Megan to fight him, but she refuses, calling him a coward. Po threatens to kill them all if she does not fight, but Megan asserts there was never any prize money, and that Po intends to kill them all regardless, her words prompting the other fighters to rally against him. As one, the men rise up to fight for their lives against Po's armed guards.

The fighters seem to have a strong advantage, until Po himself enters the fray and begins to subdue them. Though he fights bravely, Lando is easily bested by the Muay Thai master. In the end, only David and Po are left standing. After a brutal fight, David conquers his rival once again, but Bill takes Vicky at gunpoint, giving Po the opportunity to escape. David dispatches Bill with a well-aimed knife throw before he and Vicky exit the compound along with Lando and Megan.

Cast
 Sasha Mitchell as David Sloane
 Nicholas Guest as DEA Agent Casey Ford
 Brad Thornton as Lando Smith 
 Thom Mathews as Bill
 Kamel Krifa as Tong "The Tiger" Po
 Michele Krasnoo as Megan Laurence
 Deborah Mansy as Vicky Sloane
 Jill Pierce as Darcy Cove
 Nicholas Anthony as Brubaker
 Derek Partridge as Bob "Mexican Bob"
 Burton Richardson as Thomas
 Terri Conn as Eliza
 Jackson D. Kane as The Warden

Reception

Critical response
TV Guide rated it 2/5 stars and wrote: "Kickboxer 4 does proud by the franchise that gave the world Jean-Claude Van Damme". Adam Arseneau of DVD Verdict called it an improvement over the third film but still bad. In 2012, Brian Tremml of Paste included it their list of "The 25 Most Awesomely Bad Movies on Netflix Instant".

References

External links 
 
 
 

1994 films
1990s action films
1994 martial arts films
American martial arts films
Films shot in New Mexico
Films directed by Albert Pyun
Direct-to-video sequel films
Kickboxer (film series)
American sequel films
1990s English-language films
1990s American films